Hybomitra macularis is a species of horse flies in the family Tabanidae.

Distribution
Morocco

References

Tabanidae
Diptera of Africa
Taxa named by Johan Christian Fabricius
Insects described in 1794